Bao Daolei (born 17 March 1988) is a Chinese retired goalball player. He won a gold medal at the 2008 Summer Paralympics.

He had congenital cataracts.

References

Male goalball players
1988 births
Living people
Sportspeople from Shanghai
Paralympic goalball players of China
Paralympic gold medalists for China
Goalball players at the 2008 Summer Paralympics
Goalball players at the 2012 Summer Paralympics
Medalists at the 2008 Summer Paralympics
Paralympic medalists in goalball